Gregory Brooks Vaydik (born October 9, 1955) is a former National Hockey League (NHL) player. He was born in Yellowknife, Northwest Territories. As a youth, he played in the 1966 and 1967 Quebec International Pee-Wee Hockey Tournaments with a minor ice hockey team from Yellowknife. He was selected with the seventh overall pick in the 1975 NHL Amateur Draft by the Chicago Black Hawks, and played five games in the NHL without scoring any points.

Career statistics

Regular season and playoffs

International

References

External links

1955 births
Canadian ice hockey forwards
Chicago Blackhawks draft picks
Chicago Blackhawks players
Dallas Black Hawks players
Ice hockey people from the Northwest Territories
Living people
Medicine Hat Tigers players
National Hockey League first-round draft picks
New Brunswick Hawks players
Sportspeople from Yellowknife
Phoenix Roadrunners draft picks
Rochester Americans players
World Hockey Association first round draft picks